Charles Géli (born 26 March 1987)  is a French Rugby Union player. His position is Hooker and he currently plays for Montpellier. He won the 2008-09 Top 14 with USA Perpignan.

References

External links
Charles Geli on espnscrum.com.
Charles Geli on itsrugby.co.uk.

Montpellier Hérault Rugby players
French rugby union players
USA Perpignan players
1987 births
Living people